Song Geon-hee (born August 16, 1997) is a South Korean actor. He is best known for his role in the hit television series Sky Castle (2018–2019).

Filmography

Film

Television series

Web series

Theater

References

External links
 

1997 births
Living people
People from Gunpo
21st-century South Korean male actors
South Korean male film actors
South Korean male television actors
Sejong University alumni